Suzanne Gillis (Sue) is an American publisher and founder of four publications, Vermont Woman 1985, Vermont Times 1990, Provincetown Banner 1995, and Vermont Woman 2003. Gillis was born in Orangeburg, South Carolina and is a 1962 graduate of Torrington High School, Torrington, Ct, and the University of Vermont (BA Political Science 1981.)  Gillis is a long time resident of Vermont.

History of publications 

As a founding publisher, Gillis was responsible for the publication's creation, investor funding, and overall management. Each publication has its own story and history. Both Vermont Woman and the Provincetown Banner are recipients of multiple industry awards from the New England Newspaper and Press Association. Vermont Woman was a designated women's advocacy newspaper, published for a period spanning 34 years and is considered the longest-running publication of its kind in the United States. Vermont Woman closed in 2019. Vermont Woman still has an online presence. www.vermontwoman.com Many articles from 2004-2019 are available on the Vermont Woman website.

Awards 

In 1996, the weekly Provincetown Banner received Newspaper of the Year from the New England Newspaper and Press Association.  Vermont Woman newspaper has won a number of awards, including the New England Newspapers and Press Association's designation of New England Newspaper of the Year in 2007, 2008, and in 2011.

New England Newspaper and Press Association Awards

Vermont Woman Speaker Series 

In 1986, Vermont Woman newspaper hosted a lecture series which ran until 2009. This series featured speakers like Ann Richards, Valerie Plame Wilson, Gloria Steinem, and Helen Thomas.

Professional recognition 

In 2010, Gillis was inducted in the New England Newspaper Hall of Fame for her commitment to independent publishing and for providing a forum for women's voices and perspectives. Burlington, Vermont held a city-wide celebration to honor and ensure the rights of all women and girls to lead secure, creative, healthy and free lives. The March 7, 2018 honorees included Sue Gillis, publisher of Vermont Woman.

Personal life 

Gillis retired in 2019, lives on Lake Champlain in South Hero, Vermont.

External Links 

Vermont Woman website

References 

1944 births
Living people
People from Orangeburg, South Carolina
Westbrook College alumni
University of Vermont alumni
American newspaper publishers (people)